The Remaking Singapore Committee (RSC) was established in February 2002 to complement the work of the Economic Review Committee of Singapore. It was led by then-Minister of State for National Development Vivian Balakrishnan.

References

External links
Remaking Singapore website
Full Report of the Remaking Singapore Committee

2002 establishments in Singapore